Ancistrotus is a genus of beetles in the family Cerambycidae, containing the following species:

 Ancistrotus aduncus Buquet, 1853
 Ancistrotus uncinatus (Klug, 1825)

References

Prioninae